Guaya United FC is a Trinidad and Tobago professional football club, based in Guayaguayare, that plays in the National Super League.The club is Located in the Southeast of Trinidad in its Oil belt region and has vast support due to the community links.

The club was established in 2010 but has already showed its stature in Trinidad and Tobago Football by winning the 2013 super league title while creating national history as being the first club to win the title in their inaugural year of participation in the league. Guaya United FC achieved this after only three years in existence.

Stadium
The club plays its home matches in Guayaguayare Recreation Ground located in Guayaguayare.

Honours
2013–14 National Super League

Current squad
Coach: Professor Ron La Forrest,
Manager: Jameson Rigues,
John Stewart,
Chester Davis,
Jody Allsop,
Kerdell Alfred,
Earlon Thomas,
Carlon 'Judgement' Hughes,
Shaquille Ferrier,
Keston Jordan,
Sherlon Campbell,
Desta Francis,
Erskine Johnson (GK),
Shane Mattis (GK)
Glenton Wolfe (Captain),
Keylon Thomas,
Beville Joseph,
Keryn Navarro,
Kevin Jagdeosingh
Calvin Lopez,
Marcus Ramkhelawan,
Cio Morris,
Kheelon Mitchell,
Kheelon Ferrier,
Leroy Jones,
Franklyn Romain.

References

Football clubs in Trinidad and Tobago
Association football clubs established in 2010